Cleminson is a surname. Notable people with the surname include:

 James Cleminson (1921–2010), British soldier and businessman
 James Cleminson (1840–1896), inventor of Cleminson's patent axle system for railway rolling stock
 Zal Cleminson (born 1949), Scottish guitarist